The 2012 Mid-Eastern Athletic Conference baseball tournament began on May 17 and ended on May 20, 2012, at Marty L. Miller Field, on the campus of Norfolk State University in Norfolk, Virginia.  It is an eight-team double elimination tournament.  Bethune-Cookman won the tournament, as they have done every year but one since the tournament began in 1999.  The Wildcats claimed the Mid-Eastern Athletic Conference's automatic bid to the 2012 NCAA Division I baseball tournament.

Format and seeding
The four teams in the North Division and top four finishers from the South Division were seeded one through four based on regular season records, with first round matchups of the top seed from the North and the fourth seed from the South, the second seed from the North against the third seed from the South, and so on.  The winners advanced in the winners' bracket, while first round losers played elimination games.  The format meant that  was left out of the field.

Bracket

All-Tournament Team
The following players were named to the All-Tournament Team.

Outstanding Performer

See also
College World Series
NCAA Division I Baseball Championship

References

Tournament
Mid-Eastern Athletic Conference Baseball Tournament
Mid-Eastern Athletic Conference Baseball
Mid-Eastern Athletic Conference Baseball